Chicago Wind is the fifty-eighth studio album by American country singer and songwriter Merle Haggard, released in 2005. It peaked at number 54 on the Billboard Top Country Albums chart. A video was made for the track "America First".

Critical reception

Stephen Thomas Erlewine of AllMusic praised the album, writing "Chicago Wind is not the rough and rowdy honky tonk album some fans have been hankering for, but it is a poetic, thoughtful and empathic one that once more displays why Merle Haggard is the living king of country music."

Track listing
All tracks composed by Merle Haggard; except where indicated

 "Chicago Wind" – 4:08
 "Where's All the Freedom" – 3:22
 "White Man Singin' the Blues" – 3:47
 "Leavin's Not the Only Way to Go" (Roger Miller) – 3:38
 "What I've Been Meaning to Say" – 2:36
 "Mexico" – 3:11
 "Honky Tonk Man" (Dewayne Blackwell) – 3:04
 "America First" – 2:43
 "It Always Will Be" (Willie Nelson) – 4:01
 "I Still Can't Say Goodbye" (Robert Blinn, James Moore) – 3:38
 "Some of Us Fly" (with Toby Keith) – 6:38

Personnel
Merle Haggard – vocals, guitar
Don Markham – trumpet
Thom Bresh – acoustic guitar
Doug Colosio – keyboards
Shannon Forrest – drums
Scott Joss – fiddle, mandolin
Leland Sklar – bass
Brent Mason – electric guitar
Alti Ovarsson – piano
Herb Pedersen – banjo, background vocals
Mike Post – guitar, Fender Rhodes, Wurlitzer
Michael Rhodes – bass
John "4 Daddman" Robinson – drums
Billy Joe Walker, Jr. – acoustic and electric guitar
Biff Watson – acoustic guitar
Gabe Witcher – fiddle
Reggie Young – electric guitar

Chart performance

References

2005 albums
Merle Haggard albums
Albums produced by Jimmy Bowen
Capitol Records albums